Gajary is a village and municipality in western Slovakia close to the town of Malacky in the Bratislava region. It lies around 40 km (25 statute miles) north-west of Slovakia's capital Bratislava close to the Austrian border. The village has around 3500 inhabitants.

The village is an important archaeological site: findings from the Neolithic period, Eneolithic period, Bronze Age, early Slavic period (several Slavic settlements) have been excavated there.

Names and etymology
The Slovak name Gajary (1460 Gayary) comes from German personal name Geier (1337 Gaywar, later German name was Gairing). In the 14th century, the village had also the Hungarian name Öregház (Old House, 1377 Eureghaz), but the name was forgotten and then they used the name of German origin Gajár.

Genealogical resources

The records for genealogical research are available at the state archive "Statny Archiv in Bratislava, Slovakia"

 Roman Catholic church records (births/marriages/deaths): 1657-1895 (parish A)

See also
 List of municipalities and towns in Slovakia

References

External links

 Official page
https://web.archive.org/web/20070513023228/http://www.statistics.sk/mosmis/eng/run.html 
Surnames of living people in Gajary

Villages and municipalities in Malacky District